Trichovirus is a genus of viruses in the order Tymovirales, in the family Betaflexiviridae. Plants, specifically angiosperms such as pome fruits, citrus, and pear, serve as natural hosts for this plant pathogen. There are seven species in this genus.

Taxonomy
The following species are assigned to the genus:
Apple chlorotic leaf spot virus
Apricot pseudo-chlorotic leaf spot virus
Cherry mottle leaf virus
Grapevine berry inner necrosis virus
Grapevine Pinot gris virus
Peach mosaic virus
Phlomis mottle virus

Structure
Viruses in Trichovirus are non-enveloped, with flexuous and filamentous geometries. The diameter is around 10-12 nm, with a length of 640-760 nm. Genomes are linear, around 7.5-8.0kb in length. The genome codes for 3 proteins.

Life cycle
Viral replication is cytoplasmic. Entry into the host cell is achieved by penetration into the host cell. Replication follows the positive stranded RNA virus replication model. Positive stranded RNA virus transcription is the method of transcription. The virus exits the host cell by tubule-guided viral movement.
Plants, pome fruits, citrus, and pear serve as the natural host. Transmission routes are grafting. It is transmitted by mites of the family Eriophyidae, requiring a helper virus for transmission.

References

External links
 Viralzone: Trichovirus
 ICTV

Trichoviruses
Viral plant pathogens and diseases
Virus genera